Hanai Sarrigan (also Romanized as Ḩanā’ī Sarrīgān; also known as Ḩanā’ī) is a village in Howmeh Rural District, in the Central District of Minab County, Hormozgan Province, Iran. At the 2006 census, its population was 84, in 17 families.

References 

Populated places in Minab County